Ceroprepes pulvillella is a species of snout moth in the genus Ceroprepes. It was described by Zeller in 1867 and is known from India.

References

Moths described in 1867
Phycitinae